KOCO-TV (channel 5) is a television station in Oklahoma City, Oklahoma, United States, affiliated with ABC and owned by Hearst Television. Its studios and transmitter are located on East Britton Road (Historic Route 66)—between North Kelley and North Eastern Avenues—in the McCourry Heights neighborhood of northeast Oklahoma City.

Although KOCO-TV's call letters sound like "cocoa" if pronounced as a word, the station is never referred to in that manner; it is always mentioned on air as "K-O-C-O".

History

Early history in Enid
The Federal Communications Commission (FCC) originally assigned the VHF channel 5 allocation in the Oklahoma City market to Enid. The initial application to broadcast over the frequency was filed in July 1952—shortly after the FCC had lifted a four-year moratorium on new television station license applications—when the Enid Radiophone Company, a subsidiary of Enid News & Eagle parent Enid Publishing Company and owner of radio station KCRC (1390 AM), applied with the FCC to obtain a construction permit and license to operate a television station on VHF channel 5. Enid businessman George Streets, owner of local electronics manufacturer Streets Electronics Inc., filed a separate license application for channel 5 in November of that year. When the FCC awarded the license and permit for channel 5 to Streets (who would serve as its original general manager), and his ownership group (which included local building contractor Philip R. Banta, who served as the station's president, and stockholder L.D. Banta, both of whom—like Streets—held similar 21.3% interests in the station) on February 11, 1954, he requested and received approval to assign KGEO-TV (for "Greater Enid, Oklahoma") as the call letters for his television station. As consolation for losing the application grant to Streets Electronics, the Streets group gave Enid Radiophone an option to acquire a 20% stake in the station.

The station began test broadcasts on July 6, 1954; KGEO—which originally intended to debut on June 15, three weeks before test telecasts commenced—officially signed on the air nine days later on July 15. Channel 5 was the fifth television station to sign on in the Oklahoma City market—behind WKY-TV (channel 4, now KFOR-TV), which signed on the air on June 6, 1949; KTVQ (channel 25, allocation now occupied by Fox affiliate KOKH-TV), which signed on October 28, 1953; KLPR-TV (channel 19, allocation now occupied by Cornerstone Television affiliate KUOT-CD), which signed on November 8, 1953; and KWTV (channel 9), which signed on December 20, 1953—the seventh television station to sign on in the state of Oklahoma, the first within the Oklahoma City market's present designated boundaries to be licensed outside of Oklahoma City proper, and the only full-power VHF station to have operated in northern Oklahoma. The station originally maintained studio facilities located at East Randolph Avenue and North 2nd Street in northeastern Enid, adjacent to a Streets-owned appliance store; KGEO based its  transmission tower adjacent to the property.

Initially broadcasting nine hours of programming per day from 2:30 to 11:30 p.m., Channel 5 has operated as an ABC affiliate since its debut, In addition to carrying ABC programming, KGEO-TV also maintained a secondary affiliation with the NTA Film Network from October 15, 1956, until the programming service ceased operations in November 1961. The film anthology series NTA Film Spectacular was the service's only program to be cleared by KGEO/KOCO, as the majority of NTA's offerings were carried by either WKY-TV (which cleared several of NTA's drama, interview and variety series) or KWTV (which had carried most of the service's scripted programs). KGEO management charged that some provisions of National Telefilm Associates (NTA)'s contracts with NTA Film affiliates—particularly, a compulsory 11-hour "option" for affiliates to carry network programming—violated FCC rules for chain broadcasters; these accusations were rebutted in an FCC hearing on October 5, 1956, when NTA representatives claimed that the company did not abdicate license control over programs and that affiliation contracts, among other allowances, permitted stations to decline clearance of certain programs. Channel 5 became an exclusive ABC affiliate in November 1961, when National Telefilm Associates discontinued the NTA Film Network service.

Transfer to Oklahoma City
Beginning under the stewardship of the Streets group, the station's ownership made a concerted effort to migrate channel 5 into the larger Oklahoma City metropolitan area. The KGEO transmitter proposal as well as a proposal by KSWS-TV (now NBC affiliate KOBR) in Roswell, New Mexico to build a  transmission tower drew opposition from the United States Air Force and the U.S. Department of Defense (DoD), which were concerned that broadcast towers standing at heights above  would create safety hazards for military and civil aircraft. On August 5, FCC Hearing Examiner Hugh B. Hutchison issued a recommendation for approval of the move of the KGEO transmitter to the Crescent site, citing that the existing tower near Enid (located within a  proximity to Vance Air Force Base and Woodring Airport) was more of a hazard to airplanes than the proposed tower would have been, that the proposed tower would substantially place 678,439 residents within KGEO-TV's signal contour. Hutchinson also stated that KGEO was not guilty of charges made by KTVQ owner Republic Television and Radio Company that channel 5 wanted to "straddle" its transmitter between Enid and Oklahoma City to serve both cities, as between 75% and 85% of television set owners in the Enid area had oriented their home antennas to receive signals from Oklahoma City and the new tower would provide improved reception in Enid by allowing the signal to propagate into the area at the same direction that these home antennas were aimed.

On December 15, the Commission denied motions by Republic Television and Radio (which was concerned that KGEO's move to the Crescent site would create unfair competition that would result in the shutdown of the bankrupt station) to set aside the recommendation to grant of the transmitter application as well as a petition to reopen the record and call attention to the issues the move would cause. On October 9, 1956, the Enid broadcast tower collapsed as construction crews prepared to relocate the station's transmitter antenna to the newly built Crescent tower, causing an estimated $140,000 in damage. The crane boom and gin pole that was hoisting the antenna off its platform buckled along with the tower, and the antenna dug a furrow into the ground, folding into four large sections during the collapse. KGEO-TV's analog signal was briefly knocked off the air until it set up temporary transmitter facilities from an auxiliary tower in downtown Enid, where it continued to transmit until the new tower became operational.

On October 11, 1957, Streets Electronics sold KGEO-TV to the Caster-Robison Television Corporation (owned by broadcasting executives Louis E. Caster and Ashley Robison) for $950,000 plus the assumption of approximately $500,000 in debt; the sale to the Caster-Robison group received FCC approval two months later on December 11, with the then-recently deceased Caster's interest subsequently being transferred to his estate on March 5, 1958. On March 1, 1958, the station's call letters were changed to KOCO-TV (for "Oklahoma City, Oklahoma"), to reflect its new secondary city of service. Although it nominally remained an Enid station, KOCO had moved its studio operations to Oklahoma City, setting up temporary facilities inside a converted former Kimberling's grocery store on Britton Road. In October of that year, the station's operations moved to a permanent studio facility on a  plot of land near Northwest 63rd Street and Portland Avenue, which included a terrace overlooking Lake Hefner for use during local programs produced outdoors within the studio grounds. The station later requested a waiver of FCC station identification rules to identify as an Enid–Oklahoma City station on-air and in license documents; however, the Commission denied the petition in May 1961. Following Caster's death on May 15, 1960, due to a heart attack, Ashley Robison and the inheritors of Caster's estate sought offers to sell off KOCO.

In May 1961, Caster-Robison Television sold KOCO to the Cimarron Television Corporation—a subsidiary of Oklahoma City-based Capital City Investment Corporation that included among its investors, oilmen Dean A. McGee and John E. Kirkpatrick, Grayce Kerr (wife of state senator Robert S. Kerr, who also was a minority owner of KVOO-TV [now KJRH-TV] in Tulsa with McGee at the time) as well as longtime KOCO stockholders Philip and L. D. Banta—for $3 million. The sale received FCC approval on September 27 of that year. As that transaction was taking place, the FCC issued a Notice of Proposed Rulemaking to add a third commercial VHF allocation, under reduced mileage separation requirements, in eight U.S. markets. Despite the full proposal receiving backing from ABC, the FCC voted twice against relocating short-spaced VHF channels into seven of the eight proposed markets during the spring of 1963, but granted permission for KOCO's channel allocation to be shifted to Oklahoma City both times, albeit with requirements that it observe standard mileage separation requirements to limit interference with KFSA-TV and that it maintain an auxiliary studio in Enid. The FCC granted KOCO a waiver of the mileage requirement in a 5–1 vote on July 25 of that year, after station representatives convinced the Commission that KOCO's would signal be impaired within Oklahoma City at a distance sufficient under the requirements, and that, if it were to comply with standard spacing rules and Civil Aeronautics Board tower height limitations, it would be difficult for the transmitter to provide a signal that would allow it to adequately serve both the state capital and Enid. (KOCO was the second Oklahoma television station to transfer its license and operations to a larger, nearby city: fellow ABC affiliate KTVX [now KTUL] had moved from Muskogee to Tulsa in August 1957.)

In March 1964, channel 5 moved its transmitter facilities to a  tower on East Britton Road in northeast Oklahoma City, at an antenna farm housing the transmission towers of other local television and radio stations; the tower was dedicated with two days of ceremonies that included such notable guests as ABC News anchor Howard K. Smith and the husband-and-wife comedy team of Phil Ford and Mimi Hines. KOCO's formal transfer to Oklahoma City made it the third station in the state's capital city to have been affiliated with ABC: WKY-TV had aired select ABC shows under a secondary basic affiliation from its sign-on in June 1949 until August 1956 and fledgling UHF outlet KTVQ maintained a full-time primary affiliation from its sign-on in November 1953 until that station ceased operations in December 1955, with WKY-TV continuing to carry some of the network's programs while KTVQ was operating. (Like other UHF stations of the period, television viewers were required to purchase a standalone UHF tuner in order to receive KTVQ's signal.)

One of channel 5's most popular local programs was a show aimed at younger audiences; Ed Birchall hosted a local children's program on the station for 29 years from March 1959 until shortly before his death after a brief bout with advanced-stage cancer in July 1988. Originally debuting as Lunch With HoHo and airing under various titles (including HoHo's Cartoon Circus, Good Morning HoHo and HoHo's Showplace), Birchall—who donned a colored patchwork jacket and suspender pants, a small brown top hat and oversized tie in his portrayal of HoHo the Clown—starred alongside a sock puppet named Pokey (played by longtime KOCO stage manager Bill Howard), and presented various segments from educational content to light-hearted newspaper stories to cartoon shorts. A memorial service (the first of three held for Birchall) had to be moved to St. Charles Borromeo Catholic Church, one of Oklahoma City's largest churches, to accommodate a live KOCO broadcast (which was also carried by KTVY, KWTV and KOKH-TV) as well as a crowd of mourners that included an honor guard of professional clowns. Other notable past local programs produced by KGEO/KOCO included entertainment/lifestyle/fashion talk program The Ida B. Show (originally titled At Home with Ida B. and then Dateline Hollywood), whose host, Ida Blackburn, had previously hosted a local version of Romper Room for the station from 1958 to 1960; and Captain Tom's Popeye Theatre, hosted by Tom Gilmore as the titular character, who read storybooks on the program alongside the puppet version of the Alfred Lee Whittle character he developed for radio in 1948, and a local version of the Dialing for Dollars movie/trivia franchise.

Combined Communications ownership
In November 1969, Cimarron Television announced that it would sell KOCO-TV to the Phoenix, Arizona-based Combined Communications Corporation (CCC) for $6.5 million. It was the first broadcast property ever acquired by CCC, which was formed earlier that year through the merger of the KTAR Broadcasting Company (owner of company flagships KTAR-AM-TV in Phoenix) and Eller Outdoor Advertising (a company founded by CCC president Karl Eller). The sale received FCC approval on July 17, 1970. In February 1977, KOCO adopted "5 Alive" as its on-air branding, as part of Combined Communications' rollout of the "Alive" branding concept—which Peters Productions initially developed for Tribune Broadcasting-owned independent station WPIX (now a CW affiliate) in New York City in early 1976—on most of the group's television stations. It was accompanied by a logo similar to that used at the time by Atlanta sister station WXIA-TV, when it began identifying as "11 Alive" in September 1976 (WXIA is the only station out of the four former CCC outlets that continues to use the "Alive" moniker, which had also been utilized by sister station WLKY in Louisville, Kentucky and former sister WPTA in Fort Wayne, Indiana).

On March 31, 1977, Washington Star Communications announced that it would sell its Washington, D.C. flagship station WMAL-TV (now WJLA-TV) to Combined Communications, in exchange for KOCO-TV and approximately $65 million of nonvoting preferred stock in CCC. The deal, which was considered to be the largest purchase price for a single television station up to that time, was done to comply with an FCC rulemaking to diversify print and broadcast media ownership, under which the agency required Star Communications to divest itself of all but one of its D.C.-area media properties by January 1979. The proceeds from the sale, as well as a total of $65 million that Star Communications would have received within 20 years through the repurchase of Combined stock, were to be used to offset the continuing monetary losses of The Washington Star newspaper. Although the sale initially received approval from the FCC in January 1978, it was never finalized: on February 3, 1978, three weeks before the sale contract with CCC was set to expire, Star Communications sold The Washington Star to Time Inc. for $20 million plus the assumption of $8 million in debt. The FCC subsequently rescinded its approval of the transfer pending an inquiry into Time's purchase of the Star, given the basis of the trade on ensuring the newspaper's financial stability. In a meeting to reconsider its approval of the WJLA-KOCO trade in early March (which was rescheduled from its original February 24 hearing date), the FCC once again granted approval of the station trade after the commission determined that Star Communications president Joe Allbritton had not committed himself to retaining the Star and that reevaluating the approval order turned up no reason to overturn the original decision. Despite this, on March 24, Star Communications—which had twice extended its sale contract with CCC to accommodate the FCC's hearing docket following delays in the hearing date—terminated the sale, citing a court appeal filed by the Adams Morgan Organization, the District of Columbia chapter of the National Organization for Women, the D.C. Media Task Force and the National Black Media Coalition that accused Star Communications on reneging on efforts to help minority-owned groups obtain financing to acquire the company's broadcast properties.

Gannett ownership
On May 9, 1978, the then–Rochester, New York–based Gannett Company announced that it would purchase Combined Communications—which, at the time, had owned seven television and thirteen radio stations, two newspapers (The Cincinnati Enquirer and the Oakland Tribune), and an outdoor advertising unit—in an all-stock transaction worth $370 million, which was the largest transaction involving an American print and broadcast media company up to that point. The sale—which was contingent on Gannett selling its Rochester station, WHEC-TV (which it later sold for $27 million to BENI Broadcasting), to comply with FCC rules that restricted media companies from owning more than seven VHF television stations nationwide—both received FCC approval and was consummated by the boards of Gannett and Combined on June 7, 1979. Gannett (which would eventually spin off its broadcast holdings into Tegna Inc. in June 2015) made major investments in the former Combined stations, aiming to improve the local news presence at KOCO and the four sister stations included in the purchase. In the fall of 1980, the station's operations were relocated into a newly constructed, state-of-the-art studio facility located near the station's Britton Road transmitter site ( east of the studios of rival KTVY); the former studio facilities on Northeast 63rd Street were subsequently purchased by the Trinity Broadcasting Network for use as the office and production facilities for TBN owned-and-operated station KTBO-TV (channel 14). The new $2.4-million facility (designed by Oklahoma City-based architect Frank Rees) housed two production studios, offices and an expanded newsroom, and was designed to provide passive solar energy and included overhangs to shield the building's interior from sunrays to keep the building cool during the summer months.

While KOCO remained under Gannett ownership for 18 years, its position in the company's portfolio was placed in limbo several times. On September 25, 1982, Gannett announced that it would sell KOCO to the San Francisco-based Chronicle Publishing Company for $100 million, in exchange for Chronicle's NBC-affiliated Bay Area flagship station, KRON-TV (now a MyNetworkTV affiliate), which Chronicle had built and signed on in 1949. The transaction was contingent on Gannett selling its Oakland-based newspaper, East Bay Today (which served as the prototype for USA Today), to comply with cross-ownership restrictions that prohibit the common ownership of newspapers and full-power television stations in the same market, and was part of an attempt by the company to concentrate its television station holdings to major markets. On September 28, 1983, Chronicle and Gannett "mutually agreed" to terminate the sale agreement, after Chronicle management decided to retain ownership of KRON. Under Gannett, KOCO became heavily involved in community outreach initiatives; from 1981 to 1997, the station held the "5 Who Care Awards," an annual awards telecast recognizing outstanding public service contributions by local volunteers, businesses and non-profit organizations and was expanded in 1989 to offer the "Kids Who Care Awards" to honor volunteerism by Oklahoma youth. The station expanded upon these initiatives in 1989, with the creation of the "Project Challenge" campaign, which included the "Oklahoma's Best" honors for academic excellence and dedication to the teaching profession.

On September 5, 1985, Gannett announced that it would purchase the Evening News Association for $717 million. However, the purchase created an ownership conflict between KOCO-TV and NBC-affiliated rival KTVY, as FCC rules in effect at the time had prohibited a single company from owning two commercial television stations in the same market. (Even today, that combination would have been forbidden as their respective total-day viewership falls among the agency's threshold prohibiting co-ownership of any of the four highest-rated television stations within a single media market.) Gannett ultimately chose to keep KOCO on November 15, 1985, when it sold KTVY, along with fellow NBC affiliate WALA-TV (now a Fox affiliate) in Mobile, Alabama and CBS affiliate KOLD-TV in Tucson, Arizona to Miami, Florida-based Knight Ridder Broadcasting for $160 million. However, Gannett was allowed to jointly own KOCO and KTVY under a temporary waiver until the Knight-Ridder transaction was completed in February 1986, one month after the KTVY sale was finalized. On May 14, 1990, three days after KFOR-TV adopted a similar schedule, channel 5 began maintaining a 24-hour-a-day programming schedule, adding a mix of syndicated programming and infomercials as well as hourly local news updates to fill overnight timeslots. (KOCO resumed daily overnight sign-offs on December 27, 1991; it permanently instituted a 24-hour schedule on November 28, 1993, offering ABC's overnight newscast World News Now on most nights and an all-night classic film block on Fridays and Saturdays, the latter of which had previously been offered by KOCO from September 1981 until it resumed signing off on weekends in September 1987.) After having phased out the name from its news branding the previous September, when it began identifying its newscasts as 5 News, KOCO dropped the "5 Alive" moniker from general promotional use in May 1994, in conjunction with the debut of a new logo (which was inspired by the Paul Rand-designed circle 7 logo, and was replaced with the current "circle 5" logo following a subsequent rebranding in February 1995) and on-air graphics for its newscasts and station promotions; prior to that time, KOCO and WXIA (which briefly retired the "11 Alive" brand in 1993, only to begin restoring it upon viewer demand) were the only Gannett stations that had continued to use the "Alive" moniker.

On July 24, 1995, the Gannett Company announced that it had entered into an agreement to acquire Multimedia, Inc. for $1.7 billion, plus $539 million in long-term debt. When the FCC approved the merger in late November 1995, the agency's Broadcast Bureau stipulated that Gannett would have to sell KOCO and NBC-affiliated sister station WLWT in Cincinnati, Ohio to comply with cross-ownership regulations. (Gannett was also required to sell CBS affiliate WMAZ-TV and sister radio stations WMAZ [now WMAC] and WAYS in Macon, Georgia; however, the company was ultimately able to retain WMAZ-TV after the FCC modified its national ownership cap to allow broadcasters to own any number of television stations with a combined reach of up to 35% of all U.S. households.) However, since it could not legally own both a broadcast television station and a cable provider in the same market under FCC rules of the time period, Gannett was granted a waiver that gave the company until December 1996 to divest itself of either Multimedia Cablevision—which, at the time, was the major cable provider for most of Oklahoma City's suburban communities (except for Forest Park, which has historically had its public utilities aligned with Oklahoma City and, therefore, was the only area suburb that was part of Cox Communications's Oklahoma City service area at the time)—or KOCO-TV; the sale was finalized on December 4, 1995. (Gannett would retain ownership of its Oklahoma-based Multimedia systems until it sold most of the cable provider's assets to Cox in January 2000, resulting in the integration of Multimedia's suburban Oklahoma City operations with Cox's main city-area system.)

Hearst Television ownership

On November 20, 1996, Gannett announced that it would sell KOCO-TV and WLWT to San Antonio-based Argyle Television Holdings II (the successor company to the original Argyle Television, which sold most of its television stations to New World Communications in May 1994) for $20 million, in exchange for fellow ABC affiliate WZZM in Grand Rapids, Michigan and NBC affiliate WGRZ in Buffalo, New York. The sale – which required Gannett to sell the Niagara Falls, New York-based Niagara Gazette to alleviate a cross-ownership conflict with WGRZ – was approved by the FCC on January 27, 1997, and finalized on January 31. Subsequently, on March 27, 1997, the Hearst Corporation announced that it would purchase five of the seven Argyle Television stations—KOCO-TV, WLWT, ABC affiliates KHBS in Fort Smith (and its Fayetteville satellite KHOG-TV), KITV in Honolulu (and its satellites KHVO in Hilo and KMAU in Wailuku, Hawaii), and WAPT in Jackson, Mississippi, and the non-license assets of Fox affiliate WNAC-TV in Providence, Rhode Island—for $525 million. The merger was approved by the FCC on June 2, 1997, and finalized in August of that year; the combined group of Hearst's six existing television stations and the five it acquired from Argyle became known as Hearst-Argyle Television (renamed Hearst Television in May 2009). The acquisition marked Hearst's return to the Oklahoma City market; the company owned radio station KOMA (1520 AM, now KOKC) from 1932 until 1938, when Hearst sold that station to John T. Griffin (who founded KWTV in 1953). (Gannett would re-enter the Oklahoma City market in November 2019, when the now mainly publishing-centered firm acquired The Oklahoman—which, ironically, was co-owned with KFOR-TV from that station's June 1949 sign-on until founding owner Gaylord Broadcasting's sale of channel 4 to the Evening News Association was completed in October 1975—through its merger with GateHouse Media.)

On June 13, 1998, rear flank downdraft winds approaching  struck the station's Britton Road studio, causing minor damage that included a toppled backyard fence and a large dent to the dome of its weather radar. The event was broadcast live as the station was providing wall-to-wall coverage of the accompanying supercell thunderstorm, which spawned seven tornadoes across Canadian and northern Oklahoma counties, while a KOCO photojournalist positioned in the studio's garage was shooting video of the storm as it approached the Britton Road facility. Believing a tornado had touched down because of the apparent cloud-based mesocyclone rotation, Mike LaPoint (who was the station's weekend evening meteorologist from 1997 to 2001) yelled to then-chief meteorologist Rick Mitchell, "Rick, it's on the ground!" as the three men ran to take shelter inside the building. Electricity was knocked out to the studio and transmitter facilities, taking the KOCO broadcast signal off-the-air for almost 24 hours; the station remained available to Cox Communications and Multimedia Cablevision subscribers via a direct auxiliary feed transmitted by fiber optic to the cable providers.

In September 1998, when KTEN—which had been affiliated with ABC on a part-time basis since its sign-on in June 1954—disaffiliated from the network, KOCO-TV began serving as a default ABC station for areas on the Oklahoma side of the adjacent Sherman–Ada market (including the cities of Ada, Pauls Valley and Sulphur) through its existing availability on most cable providers in the region (WFAA in Dallas–Fort Worth served as the primary default affiliate for counties in far southern Oklahoma and extreme north-central Texas within the DMA). However, residents in southern Oklahoma could view most ABC programs that were preempted by KTEN via KOCO for several years beforehand, particularly after the former switched to a primary NBC affiliation in 1986 (resulting in the steady reduction of ABC-provided content on KTEN's schedule to select daytime and prime time programs by 1994, when it added an additional primary affiliation with Fox). The Sherman-Ada market would regain an ABC station of its own when KTEN launched a digital subchannel affiliated with the network on May 1, 2010. Despite this, KOCO remains available on cable and satellite providers within that market. Through this former default status, it was the only Oklahoma City television station to provide extensive live coverage of an EF4 tornado that killed eight people in Lone Grove on February 10, 2009.

Due partly to its strong syndicated programming lineup, KOCO has grown to become one of ABC's strongest affiliates in recent years; it ranked as one of the network's highest-rated affiliates from 2009 to 2012, according to Nielsen Media Research, sharing this distinction with two of its Hearst-owned sister stations, WISN-TV in Milwaukee and KMBC-TV in Kansas City; the station had also made the claim of ranking as the highest-rated ABC affiliate overall from 2007 to 2009. In December 2010, KOCO became the second television station in the Oklahoma City market (after KWTV-DT) and the sixth station in Oklahoma to carry syndicated programming in high definition.

Subchannel history

KOCO-DT2
KOCO-DT2, branded as "MeTV Oklahoma City", is the MeTV-affiliated second digital subchannel of KOCO-TV, broadcasting in widescreen standard definition on channel 5.2. In addition to carrying MeTV programming, KOCO-DT2 is also designated as an alternate ABC affiliate, and carries network (and occasionally, syndicated) programs that KOCO must preempt to carry extended breaking news or severe weather coverage or special event programming on its main channel.

KOCO launched a digital subchannel on virtual channel 5.2 in 2005, which originally carried a live feed of the station's Doppler radar—then known as "Advantage Doppler HD" (now branded as "First Alert Dual-Pol Doppler")—accompanied by an audio simulcast of NOAA Weather Radio station WXK85. In April 2008, the subchannel became an affiliate of The Local AccuWeather Channel, under the brand "First Alert Weather 24/7". Alongside carrying regional and national forecast segments provided by the AccuWeather-operated network, KOCO also produced pre-recorded local forecast segments presented by meteorologists from the station's "First Alert Weather" team—which were updated two to three times per day—for the subchannel (the radar imagery and NOAA Weather Radio feed continued to be shown after the local forecast segments, along with serving as a transition segment between its AccuWeather and E/I programming). In addition, KOCO-DT2 carried a half-hour block of syndicated children's programs compliant with FCC educational programming guidelines on Monday through Saturday afternoons, and was occasionally used to air special weather coverage from its sister stations during tropical weather events (in particular, in September 2008, it simulcast coverage of Hurricane Gustav from NBC-affiliated sister station WDSU in New Orleans to provide information on the storm for Louisiana residents who evacuated inland to Oklahoma City).

On January 24, 2011, KOCO-DT2 became an affiliate of This TV, through an affiliation agreement between Hearst Television and network co-parent Metro-Goldwyn-Mayer, which handled affiliate distribution for the movie-focused network on behalf of original managing partner Weigel Broadcasting (as Cookie Jar Group programmed a daily block of educational and entertainment-focused children's programs for This TV at the time, KOCO dropped the syndicated E/I programming that Hearst acquired for its stations' DT2 feeds to comply with educational content regulations for multicast services).

On July 24, 2012, Hearst Television and Weigel Broadcasting announced that Hearst had renewed affiliation agreements with MeTV for eight of the group's affiliates through 2015, and agreed to add the classic television network on digital subchannels of KOCO-TV and sister stations WCVB-TV in Boston, WBAL-TV in Baltimore, KCRA-TV in Sacramento and WXII-TV in Greensboro. The This TV affiliation rights for the Oklahoma City affiliation were subsequently acquired by Family Broadcasting Group, then-owner of independent station KSBI (channel 52, now a MyNetworkTV affiliate); however, because KOCO's MeTV contract did not commence for another two weeks, KSBI was forced to share the This TV affiliation with KOCO-DT2 after KSBI-DT2 began carrying the latter network on September 17, 2012. KOCO-DT2 affiliated with MeTV on October 1, 2012, at which time, KSBI became the market's exclusive This TV affiliate. On August 28, 2017, KOCO-DT2 switched to a 16:9 widescreen standard definition format; prior to the upgrade, ABC and syndicated programs presented in widescreen were transmitted on KOCO-DT2 in a horizontally compressed format to fit the subchannel's 4:3 aspect frame.

KOCO-DT3
KOCO launched a digital subchannel on virtual channel 5.3 on April 19, 2021, serving as an affiliate of home shopping network Shop LC (which had previously been available in the market through the DT6 subchannel of Enid-licensed KBZC-LD [channel 42], which disaffiliated from the network on May 1, 2021, two weeks after KOCO launched the DT3 subchannel). As of May 2022, KOCO-DT3 is inactive.

KOCO-DT4
KOCO-DT4 is the Story Television-affiliated fourth digital subchannel of KOCO-TV, broadcasting in widescreen standard definition on channel 5.4. KOCO launched a digital subchannel on virtual channel 5.4 in August 2021, serving as an affiliate for getTV until 2022. On March 28, 2022, Weigel launched Story Television on the subchannel and other Hearst and Weigel-owned stations.

KOCO-DT5
KOCO-DT5 is TheGrio-affiliated fifth digital subchannel of KOCO-TV, broadcasting in widescreen standard definition on channel 5.5. KOCO launched a digital subchannel on virtual channel 5.5 on August 26, 2021, serving as an affiliate of African-American-oriented entertainment network TheGrio.

KOCO-DT6
KOCO-DT6 is the getTV-affiliated sixth digital subchannel of KOCO-TV, broadcasting in upscaled-widescreen standard definition on channel 5.6. While KOCO-DT6 itself is not currently available on cable providers within the Oklahoma City market, getTV is available locally on Dish Network channel 373 and on subscription live TV streaming services Philo, fuboTV and Frndly TV. KOCO originally launched a digital subchannel on virtual channel 5.4 on August 26, 2021, serving as an affiliate of classic television network getTV (which had previously been available in the market through the DT4 subchannel of Enid-licensed KBZC-LD, which had carried the network since April 1, 2017, two months after getTV was displaced by the DT2 subchannel of original Oklahoma City affiliate KOCB [channel 34] to become a charter affiliate of TBD). The subchannel was deleted for unknown reasons on August 30; following a five-day hiatus, on September 3, 2021, KOCO subsequently placed getTV programming on an additional subchannel over virtual channel 5.6.

Programming
KOCO-TV currently broadcasts the majority of the ABC network schedule, although the station airs the second hour of Good Morning America Saturday (which it originally preempted from October 2019, when that edition expanded into a two-hour broadcast, until November 2020) on a one-hour delay from its Central Time feed; by effect, it also preempts the third hour of the Litton's Weekend Adventure block, the remainder of which airs on a two-hour delay from its "live feed" to accommodate the two-hour-long 5:00 a.m. and one-hour 8:00 a.m. editions of its Saturday morning newscast and both non-consecutively-aired hours of GMA Saturday. (Midday college football games that ABC carries during the fall may subject Weekend Adventure programs normally aired on Saturdays in the 11:00 a.m. hour, as well as the syndicated Teen Kids News, to be deferred to Sundays to fulfill educational programming obligations. Since KOCO began clearing the second hour of GMA Saturday, it has deferred the additional preempted Weekend Adventure hour to KOCO-DT2, airing in place of MeTV programming on Sunday mornings.) Channel 5 may preempt some ABC programs to provide long-form breaking news or severe weather coverage when necessary, or air specials produced by the station's news department (such as its KOCO 5 Chronicle series or weather and sports specials). The preempted programs may either be rebroadcast over KOCO in place of regularly scheduled overnight programs or diverted to KOCO-DT2 on a live-to-air basis in place of MeTV programming, although station personnel also gives viewers—particularly, subscribers of AT&T U-verse, DirecTV, Dish Network and some smaller cable systems within the Oklahoma City DMA that do not carry KOCO-DT2—the option of watching them for free on ABC's website and mobile app, or via subscription through Hulu (of which ABC parent The Walt Disney Company holds a controlling interest) or the network's cable/satellite video-on-demand service the day after their initial airing.

Syndicated programs broadcast by KOCO-TV  include Tamron Hall, The Kelly Clarkson Show, Access Hollywood, Matter of Fact with Soledad O'Brien (which is distributed by parent company Hearst), The Real and Wheel of Fortune. Oklahoma City is one of a small number of U.S. television markets in which Jeopardy! and Wheel are carried on separate stations: Jeopardy! airs on NBC affiliate KFOR-TV, which has carried the program locally since January 2000 after CBS affiliate KWTV initially dropped the program in September 1999 when that station moved its 4:30 p.m. newscast back to 4:00 p.m. and expanded it to an hour, only to bring Jeopardy! back a few days later in an early-morning, 4:30 a.m. timeslot. Both Wheel and Jeopardy! were seen on KWTV from their respective debuts in 1983 and 1984 until the former moved to KOCO in September 1992.

Channel 5 served as the Oklahoma City affiliate of the Children's Miracle Network Telethon from its inception in May 1983 until June 2016. Until 2004, KOCO typically aired the first hour of the telethon on tape delay after the Saturday edition of its late-evening newscast, depending on the telethon's airdate, on the last weekend of May or first weekend of June; the remainder of the telecast (including local segments hosted by KOCO on-air personalities) would then air through its conclusion the following Sunday afternoon. It also served as the local broadcaster of the United Cerebral Palsy Star-athon, a telethon to raise money for the cerebral palsy research organization, from 1962 to 1996.

Past program preemptions and deferrals
Historically, KOCO-TV has either preempted or given out-of-pattern clearances to certain ABC programs to air local, syndicated or special event programs. After it debuted a noon newscast in September 1978, the station aired All My Children (which ABC concurrently moved to the aforementioned slot with the soap opera's expansion to a full hour) on a day-behind basis at 11:00 a.m., which resulted in the preemption of ABC Daytime shows that normally occupied that hour in the Central Time Zone (such as the network version of Family Feud) until it was ceded to ABC's affiliates in September 1992; KOCO began carrying AMC live-to-air at noon on January 2, 2008, where the soap remained until it was replaced by The Chew on September 27, 2011. Loving also aired mid-mornings on a one-day delay until September 1990, when the station replaced it with the hour-long version of Home (which KOCO had aired in the talk show's optional half-hour abbreviated format since it debuted two years earlier); KOCO preempted ABC's half-hour soap operas (Loving, The City and, until the station began clearing it in September 1998, Port Charles) for most of the 1990s in favor of first-run syndicated shows and, after September 1994, an expanded midday newscast in its standard network slot. Until ABC discontinued the afternoon newsbriefs in 2012, the station also did not clear the ABC News Brief—which aired during ABC Daytime programming—in order to run additional local advertising.

Beginning with the newsmagazine's debut in February 1980, KOCO ran Nightline on a half-hour tape delay from the ABC network feed (at 11:00 p.m.) to air syndicated M*A*S*H reruns following its late newscast. In the summer of 1983, station management sought ABC's permission to further delay Nightline by 90 minutes (to 12:30 a.m.), so it could air Thicke of the Night after M*A*S*H once the syndicated late-night talk show premiered that September. ABC vetoed the request and moved Nightline to then-independent station KOKH-TV, which agreed to carry the program live-to-air; KOCO relented and received permission to resume airing Nightline on a one-hour delay beginning in April 1984, pushing back the near-cancellation Thicke by an extra half-hour. (The station eventually shifted Nightline to its network slot in September 1995.) Similarly, channel 5 tape-delayed other ABC late night shows that directly followed Nightline to air additional syndicated programming in late access: Politically Incorrect with Bill Maher aired on a half-hour delay from its then-recommended 11:05 p.m. Central timeslot from its ABC debut in September 1995 until it ended in December 2002; its replacement, Jimmy Kimmel Live! (which has preceded Nightline since the network switched the scheduling order of the two programs in January 2013), aired on a one-hour delay from its January 2003 premiere, in favor of a same-day Oprah rebroadcast, until KOCO pushed Kimmel to the show's network "live" slot in September 2011.  Because it signed off during the overnight hours at the time, KOCO also preempted the ABC News program World News Now from its January 6, 1992 premiere until the station permanently instituted a 24-hour schedule on November 28, 1993.

Channel 5 also preempted portions of ABC's Saturday morning lineup intermittently through September 2006 (as an example, The Bugs Bunny and Tweety Show and Ewoks were preempted in favor of the local real estate program Home Showcase in 1987). The station also preempted all but 90 minutes of the then four-hour-long lineup between April 1992 and September 1996, in order to accommodate a local Saturday morning newscast and other syndicated programming. From September 1996 until December 2007, the ABC children's programs that were recommended to air during the 10:00 a.m. hour aired instead on a one-week delay at 7:00 a.m.; KOCO aired the remaining two hours in pattern from the ABC off-air feed. The various Power Rangers series that aired as part of the ABC Kids block were also aired on a one-week delay from 5:00 to 6:00 a.m., instead of the network's "live"-fed slot during the 11:00 a.m. hour, from September 2003 until September 2006; as Hearst's other ABC stations opted to do with the series, KOCO preempted Power Rangers thereafter until the series was dropped by the network on August 28, 2010, due to the program's lack of educational content. (For similar reasons, the station tape-delayed Kim Possible and Power Rangers SPD for broadcast on early Monday mornings before World News Now during the 2005–06 season.)

It was also among the more than 20 stations that declined to air ABC's November 2004 telecast of Saving Private Ryan, amid concerns that the intense war violence and strong profanity retained from the 1998 World War II-set film's theatrical cut would subject stations that aired it to being fined by the FCC, which initiated a crackdown on indecent material following the wardrobe malfunction incident during Justin Timberlake and Janet Jackson's Super Bowl XXXVIII halftime show performance that February. KOCO, along with the eight other Hearst-owned ABC stations—out of the eleven it owned at the time—that also refused to air Saving Private Ryan, chose to air the 1992 film Far and Away in its place. (The FCC eventually determined that, even though content typically prohibited from being shown on broadcast television was not expurgated from the film's network cut, the movie's broadcast did not violate agency regulations.)

Sports programming
Sports programming on KOCO-TV is sourced solely through ABC's ESPN-managed sports programming unit, ESPN on ABC. Through ABC's television contract with the Big 12 Conference, channel 5 serves as the primary over-the-air rightsholder to college football games involving the Oklahoma Sooners and the Oklahoma State Cowboys. The station's sports department also produces local pre-game and post-game shows that air around ABC-televised Sooners and Cowboys games, as well as a regular season preview show covering both teams that airs each August. (Over-the-air regular season Sooners and Cowboys games not shown on KOCO air instead on KOKH-TV by way of Fox's partial broadcast television rights to the Big 12.) In September 1982, after the Tenth Circuit U.S. Court of Appeals issued a stay of a district court order that ruled network and cable contracts for college football telecasts reached by the National Collegiate Athletic Association (NCAA) to be in violation of antitrust rules, the University of Oklahoma sold KOCO-TV the local television rights to a game between the Sooners and the USC Trojans under arrangement with the Katz Agency sports management firm. The court's delay in acting on the case and time constraints thereof led to the university abandoning its effort to telecast the game on KOCO.

After NCAA regulations restricting the number of college football games that could be televised live in a single season were overturned by the U.S. Supreme Court in 1984, KOCO acquired the local rights to a Katz Sports-syndicated package of college football games involving Big Eight Conference teams. (Katz subsequently sold the rights to the college football games and certain other sports events to Raycom Sports after the 1985 NCAA Division I college football season.) From 1988 to 1991 and again from 1993 to 1995, KOCO also maintained a programming agreement with the Sooners to air various team-related programs during the regular season, including the head coach's weekly analysis program Oklahoma Football, which was co-hosted by then-sports director Dean Blevins and Sooners football coach Gary Gibbs. (Fox affiliate KOKH held the local rights to the Sooners magazine programs for the 1992 season, with KOCO carrying select Oklahoma State Cowboys programs such as analysis program The Pat Jones Show in the interim.)

From 1992 to 1994, KOCO carried select basketball games involving the city's now-defunct Continental Basketball Association (CBA) franchise, the Oklahoma City Cavalry, with Blevins also providing color commentary for the telecasts. Since the team's relocation from Seattle in 2008, under ABC's share of sister network ESPN's television contract with the National Basketball Association (NBA), channel 5 has also carried certain ABC-televised regular season and playoff games featuring the Oklahoma City Thunder. Notably, in 2012, the station aired the Thunder's first NBA Finals appearance as an Oklahoma City-based franchise (their fourth overall, counting the pre-relocation Seattle SuperSonics' previous appearances in 1978, 1979 and 1996), which saw the Miami Heat defeat the Thunder to win the championship title four games to one.

News operation
, KOCO-TV broadcasts 44 hours of locally produced newscasts each week (with seven hours each weekday and 4 hours each on Saturdays and Sundays); the station also produces an additional three hours of newscasts each week (consisting of a half-hour nightly except Saturdays) for its MeTV-affiliated DT2 subchannel. During times when sports programming is airing, channel 5 regularly preempts its early evening newscasts on Saturdays—the 5:00 p.m. edition since August 2009, and the 6:00 p.m. edition (previously the 10:00 p.m. edition), which had previously been subject to frequent overrun-related programming delays, since ABC bridged its football coverage upon moving the start time of its Saturday Night Football telecasts ahead by a half-hour in August 2019—to accommodate ABC's college football game coverage. Through a content agreement with Community Newspaper Holdings, KOCO also contributes news content featured in two of the group's Oklahoma newspaper properties, The Norman Transcript and the Enid News & Eagle.

News department history
Channel 5's news department began operations when the station signed on as Enid-based KGEO-TV on July 2, 1954, initially consisting of a half-hour, weekday-only 12:30 p.m. newscast. By the time the station moved to Oklahoma City in 1958, the re-called KOCO was running a five-minute newscast at 6:25 p.m. and a half-hour newscast at 10:00 p.m. each weeknight (later evolving into half-hour newscasts at 5:30 p.m. weeknights and at 10:00 p.m. seven nights a week by 1964). Ernie Schultz (who would later serve as a news director for WKY-TV and KWTV) served as the original main anchor of the Monday through Friday editions. As part of the condition of the station's license transfer to Oklahoma City that required it to maintain an auxiliary studio in its original city of license, KOCO maintained a news bureau at its original Randolph Street facility in Enid; the bureau would eventually be closed by station management in 1995. From September 1965 until September 1970, the station produced a Sunday evening news and features program, Sundayscope, which also featured a regular viewer mail segment hosted by general manager Ben K. West. The weeknight newscasts were reformatted in 1968 as The Hickox-Halburnt Report, anchored by news director Richard Hickox and assistant news director Joe Halburnt Jr.; they were replaced by Dean Swanson in 1971, at which point, the newscasts were retitled The News on 5. In 1974, as the Eyewitness News format was growing in popularity in television markets throughout the nation, KOCO-TV renamed its newscasts to Channel 5 Eyewitness News. (It was the second station in the Oklahoma City market to have utilized the format, following a previous run at KWTV between 1966 and 1971; the format was later re-used by KOCO, as Eyewitness News 5, from July 1998 to April 2013.) By this time, Swanson and chief meteorologist Fred Norman were joined weeknights by sports director Jerry Park, who would become the station's longest-serving on-air personality, working there for 25 years.

Under the helm of news director Tom Kirby (who was later promoted to president and general manager of KOCO, remaining in that role until his resignation to pursue consulting work in 1993), the station made aggressive moves to improve its standing among the market's television news operations by highlighting investigative reporting and extensive coverage of breaking news events—among which, included live and filmed coverage of a July 1973 riot at the Oklahoma State Penitentiary in McAlester, which was compiled into a one-hour documentary that received a commendation by the National Council on Crime and Delinquency. The station also acquired a private airplane to transport reporters and camera crews to news stories and pick up edited film reels. In 1973, Ben Tipton—a former radio host at KBYE (890 AM, now KTLR)—joined KOCO as the station's first African American on-air personality and the first black news anchor in the Oklahoma City market. Tipton served as a weekend evening anchor and political reporter and also created and hosted The Black Review, a weekly public affairs program focusing on community events and topical discussions focusing on Oklahoma's African-American community that aired on channel 5 under various titles (later as Saturday Review [alternately titled Sunday Review whenever ABC Sports telecasts bumped the program from its Saturday midday timeslot] from September 1979 to March 1989 and Oklahoma Collage thereafter until its cancellation) from January 1976 until November 1993. After Tipton left KOCO in 1977 to become the Ward 7 councilman on the Oklahoma City Council, representing the city's predominately African-American northeast section, Joyce Jackson-Combs—who began at KOCO as a clerical assistant in 1970 and eventually rose the ranks to become an assignment reporter until her departure in 1989—took over as host of the retitled Saturday Review (remaining in that role until the program was cancelled by KOCO station management) and became the station's public service director.

 After being acquired by Gannett, the company made substantial investments in KOCO's news operations—among them, the acquisition of an Aerospatiale Astar 350 (branded as "Sky 5"), which was the first helicopter to be used for aerial newsgathering in the Oklahoma City market upon its introduction in February 1978. The format changes during the 1970s ultimately did not reward the station's newscasts with a ratings win, as KOCO remained at a distant third place in the ratings for many years against the then-long-dominant channel 4 and the perennially second-place KWTV. In 1977, KOCO began airing "Wednesday's Child", a weekly feature segment on its 10:00 p.m. newscast that was presented by Jack Bowen (who served as an anchor/reporter at the station from 1974 to 1987 and again from 1990 to 1995), which profiled children in need of an adoptive family. In June 1979, while on assignment at a Public Service Company of Oklahoma (PSO) press conference, KOCO anchor/reporter Ron Stahl and photographer Bill Collard were arrested on a trespassing complaint after crossing a utility fence to cover a protest against the construction of a nuclear power plant in Inola. The convictions were appealed on press freedom infringement complaints, but were upheld by the U.S. Court of Appeals for the Western District of Oklahoma. The Supreme Court declined to review the case upon consideration in January 1984, letting stand the convictions of Stahl and the other reporters.

KOCO's ratings fortunes improved from 1980 to 1982, when its newscasts briefly overtook KWTV for second place following the installment of Jack Bowen and Mary Ruth Carleton as its primary anchor team, alongside Norman and Park. The station's newscasts—then titled 5 Alive NewsCenter, eventually being shortened to 5 Alive News in January 1984—even battled longtime powerhouse KTVY for first in the market. On May 31, 1982, the station's early-evening newscast – which had been airing at 5:30 p.m. (instead of the 6:00 p.m. timeslot then used exclusively by most network stations, including some ABC affiliates) since September 1972, following ABC's initial 5:00 p.m. Central Time feed of the ABC Evening News – was shifted to 5:00 p.m., where it had previously aired from 1968 to 1972, and retitled Live at Five. (Around this time, ABC had begun requiring affiliates located outside of the Eastern and Pacific Time Zones to swap the airtimes of the successor World News Tonight and their local early evening newscasts – then also aired in that order on ABC's other Oklahoma-based affiliates, KTUL, KTEN and KSWO-TV in Lawton – to allow the former to compete directly with NBC and CBS's evening newscasts.) A separate half-hour newscast at 6:00 p.m. (originally titled Newsplus at 6:00) subsequently premiered on September 20 of that year. (All three broadcasts ranked the market's most-watched news programs in those time periods during the November 2006 sweeps period.) In 1984, the station was sued for defamation by local OB-GYN William Crittendon, who claimed a report on a medical malpractice case he was being tried for had misquoted an expert witness who said that a patient had a "perfectly healthy" (rather than "perfectly normal") uterus; the Oklahoma Supreme Court ruled that station management must pay Crittendon $550,000 in damages; an appeal of the ruling, charging First Amendment violations, gained the support of the National Association of Broadcasters, which contended that the court did not establish negligence or causation.

The station also collaborated with ABC News' 20/20 on the 1981 undercover investigative report "Throwaway Kids". Reported locally by then-assignment reporter Pam Henry, the investigative series—which went on to earn Peabody and Emmy Awards—looked into abuse, neglect and preventable deaths of children, elderly and mentally ill persons in the care of the Oklahoma Department of Human Services (OKDHS) that would lead to the resignation of agency director Lloyd Rader. By 1983, channel 5's newscasts had settled into a solid second place as a series of anchor changes helped propel KWTV from a distant third all the way to first place, displacing KTVY from the #1 ratings position it held for decades. On September 12, 1983, the 5:00 p.m. newscast adopted the Newscope format, a customizable syndicated news concept for local stations that featured local perspectives on major national and international news stories as well as consumer and entertainment news; KOCO reformatted the 5:00 show as a traditional local newscast after Newscope was discontinued nationally in September 1984. A main weakness of KOCO has been the turnover rate of its on-air news department staff. Massive staffing changes took place during 1984 under newly appointed vice president of news operations Gary Long (a former general manager at ex-sister station KARK-TV in Little Rock). Anchors Mary Ruth Carleton and Gan Matthews, farm reporter Gene Wheatley, assignment reporter Jennifer Eve, and sports anchor Tony Sellars (the latter four of which had joined KWTV by the end of 1984) left or had their contracts not be renewed, while longtime weeknight meteorologist Fred Norman was shifted to the weekend evening newscasts, where he would remain until his retirement in 1987. In addition, Gerry Harris (who joined channel 5 from WTNH in Hartford, Connecticut) and meteorologist Wayne Shattuck (who had been working as a primary weather anchor at KDFW in Dallas for four years, following a prior stint at KOCO from 1977 to 1980) were hired to join Bowen and Park on the weeknight newscasts.

In an effort to improve KOCO's newscast ratings, which had declined to a distant third place over the preceding years as a result of the changes, the station lured away several anchors from rival KTVY, including Jane Jayroe (who, at the start of her first tenure at KOCO from 1978 to 1980, became the station's first female news anchor) and Jerry Adams (who replaced Bowen after he left channel 5 to replace Roger Cooper as KWTV's main co-anchor), both of whom joined Harris (who had been moved to the noon and 5:00 p.m. newscasts, and became a feature reporter for the nightly segment "Oklahoma Pride") as the station's primary evening anchors. Brothers Butch and Ben McCain were also hired to anchor the noon newscast as well as a new hour-long weekday news and features program, Good Morning Oklahoma, which debuted on August 3, 1987, and maintained a similar—albeit slightly more news-driven—format as their short-lived KTVY program AM Oklahoma. (The McCains also hosted two music video programs for KOCO, Hot Country Hits from May 1992 to May 1994 and Chartbusters in 1993, as well as the local academic quiz show Challenge [Bowl] from September 1988 to September 1994.) The late 1980s also saw the station's newscasts shift toward a "softer, entertainment-influenced approach" that incorporated more infotainment and special interest segments alongside hard news content. In 1988, Dean Blevins was hired as KOCO's sports director, resulting in Jerry Park being relegated to the weekend evening newscasts. (Park—who retired from KOCO in May 1999—was later shifted to the Saturday morning newscast upon its 1992 debut, with Myron Patton replacing him on weekend evenings.) On September 2, 1988, the station premiered Prep Sports Extra, a Friday night program that covered high school football games from around the state during the fall season (which, depending on the year, aired anywhere from 15 to 30 minutes); the program's brief suspension for the fall of 1996—attributed to longtime sports anchor and co-host Mick Cornett's promotion to weekday morning news anchor that year—led to such viewer outcry that the station reinstated Prep Sports Extra (eventually renamed High School Playbook in September 2012) midway through that year's academic football season.

On May 14, 1990, KOCO-TV implemented the "24-Hour News Source" concept, producing 30-second-long news updates during commercial breaks outside of long-form newscasts near the top of each hour throughout the day as well as weather updates on weekend mornings. It also provided a weekdaily overnight news feed consisting of a simulcast of All News Channel's overnight programming and additional content sourced from its then-sister stations WXIA in Atlanta and fellow ABC affiliate KUSA-TV (now an NBC affiliate) in Denver. Later that month, KOCO filed a trademark lawsuit against KFOR and its owner at the time, Des Moines-based Palmer Communications, seeking $208,000 in damages and an injunction to stop KFOR from promoting itself as the "24-Hour News and Information Station." KOCO representatives claimed that it had been the exclusive owner of the "24-Hour News Source" moniker in Oklahoma City since 1980, and KFOR's three-day jump in adopting the format and slogan upon its switch to a 24-hour schedule caused viewer confusion that denied KOCO immediate recognition with its rollout. Oklahoma County District Court Judge Bana Blasdel denied the station's request for an emergency temporary restraining order to prevent KFOR, which contended it was using a slogan that could not be trademarked, from using the term on May 25. The parties would later settle the suit, with KOCO continuing to air round-the-clock news updates until December 27, 1991, when it discontinued the All News Channel block to reinstate an overnight sign-off period. KFOR also continued to use the "24-Hour News Source" concept until 1999, but changed its slogan in November 1990 to reference its use of the format obliquely. (KOCO utilized a retooled version of the concept from 1998 to 1999, providing top-of-the-hour weather updates from the newly branded "24-Hour First Alert Weather" team.) Channel 5's implementation of the format won it a first place honor for innovation at the Best of Gannett Awards in 1990.

1990 also saw KOCO become the first television station in the Oklahoma City market to offer closed captioning of its newscasts for deaf and hearing-impaired viewers. In addition, Tom McNamara (previously with KTVK in Phoenix, Arizona) joined Jayroe as co-anchor of KOCO's weeknight newscasts; Jerry Adams was reassigned to the weekend evening newscasts, co-anchoring alongside Jennifer Eve in a pairing that saw the weekend broadcasts being tongue-in-cheekily marketed as The Adams & Eve Report. (Adams left the station in 1991, later to be replaced as Eve's weekend co-anchor by assignment reporter Jeff Mirasola, with whom she co-anchored the weekend editions from 1988 until Adams' move from the weeknight newscasts.) On April 18, 1992, KOCO debuted a three-hour-long Saturday morning newscast—the first local newscast in the Oklahoma City market to be offered on weekend mornings—from 9:00 a.m. to 12:00 p.m., taking over part of the timeslot occupied by ABC's Saturday cartoon lineup. (The newscast—by then, reduced to two hours—would shift to 8:00 a.m. on September 9, 1995, and then to 10:00 a.m. on September 13, 1997.) Then on September 11, 1995, the noon newscast was expanded to one hour, replacing first-run syndicated shows that had been occupying the 12:30 half-hour locally since the ABC soap opera Ryan's Hope ended in December 1988. (The midday newscast would revert to a half-hour on September 7, 1998, to accommodate the ABC soap opera Port Charles.) The weekday morning newscast was expanded into a 90-minute broadcast (starting at 5:30 a.m.) on February 2, 1998; it would subsequently expand again to two hours (starting at 5:00) on February 1, 1999. During the early- and mid-1990s, KOCO maintained an investigative unit—known as the "I-Team"—led by investigative and assignment reporter Terri Watkins, who worked at channel 5 from 1982 until she retired from broadcasting in 2006. During her tenure at KOCO, Watkins was nominated for and won multiple awards for her various reports including two Peabody Awards, several Edward R. Murrow Awards, Houston International Film and Video Festival, New York International Film Festival, Associated Press and Oklahoma Association of Broadcasters awards, and six Emmy nominations (most notably, for her coverage of the 1995 Alfred P. Murrah Federal Building bombing and the trial and execution of bombing co-conspirator Timothy McVeigh).

The 1990s saw continued changes to its anchor team that included the move of weekend anchor Jennifer Eve—who rejoined KOCO in 1987, after a reporting stint from 1982 to 1984—replacing the departing Jane Jayroe (in 1992) and Gerry Bonds (née Harris, in 1993) on the weeknight newscasts, a position Eve remained in until she left television news in 2001; Ben and Butch McCain being pulled from Good Morning Oklahoma in May 1994, after the station decided to switch its morning show to a conventional news format (the McCains would file a wrongful termination lawsuit against KOCO centering on their firing in September 1996); and Jack Bowen departing for Fox affiliate KOKH in November 1995 to become co-anchor of its then soon-to-launch 9:00 p.m. newscast. In September 1991, KOCO premiered Hollywood Spotlight, a movie review and interview program hosted by entertainment reporter Dino Lalli (who joined the station in 1988, after a four-year stint at KNBC in Los Angeles, and had worked at KTVY beforehand); the program—which usually aired Saturdays, in either an afternoon or early evening slot—ended in August 1997, following Lalli's departure from channel 5.

In July 1998, KOCO rebranded its newscasts from Oklahoma's 5 News to Eyewitness News 5, a moniker which remained until April 18, 2013, when the newscasts began utilizing the current KOCO 5 News identity. Though the "circle 5" logo introduced in the last years of Gannett ownership was retained, the Hearst-Argyle generic GFX package in use at the time (with a visual appearance of swirling light and patterns intended to resemble a camera lens) was instituted. However, the music package intended to accompany this, the "A Package" from Gari Communications (composed for Hearst in 1995), was unable to be used, as rival KWTV had begun to use said music package in 1997; this necessitated the commissioning of the "B Package" from Gari for KOCO's use (designed to sound similar to the "A Package", Hearst-Argyle stations began to use either package from then on into 2003; these music packages would later be renamed by Gari Media to "Image News" and "Revolution", respectively) In 1999, then-weekend evening anchor/reporter Cherokee Ballard—who worked at the station from 1989 to 2005, and was the first person of Native American descent to anchor a local newscast in the Oklahoma City market—became the focus of a series of reports chronicling her battle with non-Hodgkin's large-cell lymphoma (for which she had been diagnosed with that June) to educate viewers about the disease. (Ballard's cancer went into remission the following year.) KOCO has increased its commitment to news and weather coverage in recent years, with these efforts helping propel the station's 5:00 p.m. newscast to first place in the ratings in 2004, followed by its first-ever outright win at 6:00 p.m. in November 2006. In February 2006, the station extended its weekend morning news programming to Sundays, with the addition of a two-hour 7:00 a.m. newscast. That same year, the Sunday edition of the 10:00 p.m. newscast expanded to a full hour, resulting in Sunday Sports Xtra—a sports wrap-up program that debuted on September 4, 1994, as Sports Final, and was relaunched after a seven-month hiatus as Sports Extra in August 1997—converting from a standalone program to a 15-minute tail-end segment within the newscast (the Sports Extra moniker was used as the umbrella title for its sports segments from 2006 to February 2012).

After more than two decades of turnover with its evening anchor team, the station eventually gained stability with its primary anchor team when it paired Jessica Schambach (the longest-serving member of channel 5's current on-air news staff, who joined the station in 2002 as a reporter, and was promoted to the evening newscasts in 2005 as 5:00 p.m. co-anchor) and Paul Folger (who joined the station from WTEV [now WJAX-TV] in Jacksonville) on the weeknight newscasts in 2008. The two were later joined in August 2017 by Abigail Ogle (daughter of KFOR evening anchor Kevin Ogle, and who joined KOCO as a sports reporter in 2012) as co-anchor of the 6:00 p.m. newscast. Folger left KOCO in July 2018 to become lead anchor at fellow ABC affiliate KSTP-TV in Minneapolis–St. Paul; Ogle temporarily served as Schambach's weeknight co-anchor on a full-time basis until March 2019, when Evan Onstot (formerly an evening anchor at KSEE in Fresno) was added as co-anchor, relegating Ogle to 6:00 p.m. anchor and 5:00 and 10:00 p.m. field reporter. The week of January 2, 2008 saw further changes to its news schedule: the noon newscast was cancelled, the 5:00 p.m. newscast was expanded to Saturday evenings, and the Saturday and Sunday morning newscasts were moved to an earlier, uniform timeslot from 5:00 to 7:00 a.m. (In lieu of a midday newscast, a 30-second weather update airs before ABC Daytime programming in that timeslot; the Saturday 5:00 p.m. newscast is preempted during the fall to accommodate ABC's college football coverage.) In October 2009, KOCO upgraded its severe weather, school closings and news tickers to be overlaid on high definition programming without having to downconvert HD content to standard definition. An hour-long extension of the station's weekend morning newscasts debuted on July 31, 2010, airing from 8:00 to 9:00 a.m. (The expansion coincided with ABC turning over one hour of its ABC Kids Saturday morning block, which would be replaced by Litton's Weekend Aventure that September, to its owned-and-operated and affiliated stations.) This was followed on September 22, with the expansion of the weekday morning newscast to 4:30 a.m., becoming the first television station in Oklahoma to expand its morning newscasts to a pre-5:00 a.m. timeslot.

On April 18, 2013, KOCO became the third commercial station in Oklahoma City to begin broadcasting its local newscasts in high definition. (Prior to the move, KOCO utilized a pillarboxed presentation for its newscasts from October 5, 2009, to October 11, 2010; the station transmitted in-studio segments in and upconverted field news video to the 16:9 widescreen format thereafter.) With the conversion to HD, KOCO implemented a standardized graphics package (designed by the Hearst graphics hub at Orlando sister station WESH) and music package ("Strive" by inthegroovemusic) unveiled in July 2012 on WESH. On April 8, 2016, KOCO launched an hour-long, weekday newscast at 9:00 a.m. (which, though not technically an extension of its 4:30–7:00 a.m. newscast, uses that broadcast's on-air staff), and a nightly, half-hour 9:00 p.m. newscast for KOCO-DT2 (which directly competes against a nightly hour-long newscast on KOKH-TV—which debuted in May 1996 as Oklahoma City's first local prime time newscast, and is subject to overrun-caused delays by prime time Fox Sports game telecasts—and a KFOR-produced half-hour newscast on KAUT-TV, which has aired only on weeknights since its June 2006 launch). (The latter program was part of an effort by Hearst around this timeframe to launch prime time newscasts on the MeTV subchannels of its non-duopoly stations.) On April 4, 2016, beginning with a special into the investigation and arrest of convicted former Oklahoma City police officer Daniel Holtzclaw (who was convicted in December 2015 of multiple counts—including rape, sexual battery and forcible oral sodomy—committed against eight African American women in traffic stops he conducted in the majority-Black northeast Oklahoma City), the station premiered KOCO 5 Chronicle, a recurring series of hour-long prime time specials focusing on state and community issues. (The program is titled after Chronicle, a half-hour weeknightly newsmagazine that debuted on Boston sister station WCVB-TV in January 1982, which has also loaned its title for use by other Hearst stations for daily or recurring newsmagazine programs that debuted during the second half of the 2010s.)

When The Dr. Oz Show ended on January 14, 2022, KOCO announced that it would expand its news coverage to 11 a.m. the following Monday as a lead-in to GMA3: What You Need To Know.

When The Ellen DeGeneres Show ended in May 2022 and has aired repeats during the summer, KOCO announced that it would move its news coverage from 11 a.m. to 4 p.m. (along with the other Big Three affiliates in Oklahoma City), leading out of The Kelly Clarkson Show.

Weather coverage
Although not as well known as its two principal competitors in this arena, KOCO-TV has made continual efforts over the years to improve its coverage of severe weather affecting Oklahoma. The station's Doppler weather radar system, branded on-air as "KOCO 5 First Alert Dual-Pol Doppler", utilizes data from a radar site at the station's Britton Road studios as well as live VIPIR data from radars operated by regional National Weather Service forecast offices. KOCO's First Alert Weather meteorologists provide local weather updates and, in the event of significant severe weather situations (such as a tornado warning) affecting Central Oklahoma, audio simulcasts of long-form severe weather coverage for University of Oklahoma-owned NPR member station KGOU (106.3 FM) and Champlin Broadcasting-owned country radio station KNAH (99.7 FM). In addition, through a content agreement with Community Newspaper Holdings, KOCO also provides forecast data for the weather page inserts in the Enid News & Eagle and The Norman Transcript. (Both newspapers erroneously continue to use the station's 1998–2013 news logo under the Eyewitness News 5 brand in their forecast pages.)

When Fred Norman was hired as the station's chief meteorologist in 1972, he became known among viewers for his quirky colloquialisms and lively on-air delivery, but also sought to improve channel 5's weather coverage. During the mid-to-late 1970s, the station offered "Weather Watch", a nightly post-sign-off feature consisting mainly of live imagery of the station's weather radar, along with any cut-ins from the station's meteorologists in the event that the National Weather Service issued severe weather alerts for the KOCO viewing area during the overnight sign-off period. Following the 1989 promotion of Mike Morgan to chief meteorologist, amid the departure of Wayne Shattuck (who was also succeeded in that capacity by Morgan at KFOR in 1993), KOCO's weather department invested the development of new technology to relay warnings and footage of inclement weather from the field. In July 1990, "5 Alive WeatherTrack" (later known as "WeatherPhone 5" until it was discontinued in 2004), a toll phone service providing local and worldwide weather information, was launched.

In 1989, the station developed First Alert, the first automated weather warning system for television use (which was based on the manual-input First Warning system developed by KWTV around that time); it also assembled crews of storm chasing units, the "First Alert Storm Teams" (or "F.A.S.T. units"), which utilized custom vehicles equipped with video cameras and pioneering technology that enabled still photographs to be transmitted over cellular telephone using a dash-mounted computer combined with photo compression codecs. Developed in conjunction with station engineers, chief photographer Chris Lee (who joined KOCO in 1977) and Cellular One, "First Pix" was unveiled on April 9, 1992, to transmit photographs of a tornado. ("First Pix" as well as "First Alert" would earn the station a Regional News Emmy Award in 1991.) Morgan—who was later sued for breach of contract and accusations of taking storm-related videotapes, computer programs and forecasting equipment without the station's permission—left KOCO to become chief meteorologist at KFOR-TV in August 1992, and was later briefly replaced by former Weather Channel severe weather expert Vince Miller. During Miller's brief tenure, in April 1993, the station became the first in the United States to disseminate live storm footage utilizing night vision technology. (This concept was later revived in 2015 as a feature of the "First Alert Storm Command," a mobile storm tracking unit that contains a roof-mounted 360° camera and a large monitor that is occasionally used to provide real-time radar data from the field.)

After Rick Mitchell took over as chief meteorologist in 1994, it would become the first station to utilize a mobile Doppler radar system, to send video over cellular telephone (earning the station a Regional Emmy nomination) and to distribute full-screen video over cell phones. KOCO's coverage of an F5 tornado that killed 36 people in several of Oklahoma City's southern suburbs on May 3, 1999, earned the station a special recognition award from Governor Frank Keating. Mitchell remained with KOCO until July 2012, when he became an evening meteorologist at KXAS-TV in Dallas–Fort Worth. In March 2000, the station unveiled the "Neighborhood Network," a network of sensors that relayed real-time weather observations from sites throughout central Oklahoma, and "Predictor," which compiles computer model data to display hour-by-hour forecasts up to 48 hours in advance. In October 2012, Mitchell was succeeded by Damon Lane (who had been with the station since 2009 as a weekday morning meteorologist), who just eight months later on May 20, 2013, covered an EF5 tornado that killed 24 people in Moore, narrowly missing the home he lived in with wife Melissa Newton (formerly a reporter at KOCO from 2004 to 2006). The station's coverage of that tornado earned KOCO a Regional Emmy nomination, and chronicled in part by Lane in a 2016 episode of the ABC docu-series In an Instant.

Notable former on-air staff
 Ed Birchall (a.k.a. "Ho Ho the Clown") – children's television personality (1959–1988; deceased)
 Dean Blevins – sports director (1988–1994; now at KWTV in same position)
 Mick Cornett – sports anchor/morning news anchor/reporter (1981–1999; later Mayor of Oklahoma City from 2004 to 2018 and Oklahoma Republican gubernatorial candidate in 2018)
 Bill Geddie – news photographer (1978–1991; later co-creator/executive producer of The View)
 Jane Jayroe – anchor/reporter (1977–1980 and 1987–1992; former Miss America 1967)
 Ben McCain – weekday morning anchor (1987–1994; now actor and producer/host/reporter at Spectrum in Los Angeles)
 Butch McCain – weekday morning meteorologist (1987–1994; now actor/weather anchor at KKCO in Grand Junction, Colorado)
 Rick Mitchell – chief meteorologist (1994–2012; now at KXAS-TV in Dallas–Fort Worth)
 Mike Morgan – chief meteorologist (1989–1992; now at KFOR-TV in same position)
 Chad Myers – weekend evening meteorologist (1990–1992; now at CNN)
 Milissa Rehberger – weekday morning and noon anchor/reporter (1996–2002; now at MSNBC)
 Cameron Sanders (aka Ron Sanders) – reporter (1982–1983; later correspondent for CNN and host of American Public Media's Marketplace)

Technical information

Subchannels
The station's digital signal is multiplexed:

KOCO-TV is one of several ABC-affiliated stations owned by Hearst (including, among others, WCVB-TV in Boston, WMUR-TV in Manchester, New Hampshire, WTAE-TV in Pittsburgh, KETV in Omaha and KMBC-TV in Kansas City) that transmit the primary feed of its digital signal and all high definition programming it carries in the 1080i HD format, instead of ABC's preferred 720p format.

Analog-to-digital conversion
KOCO-TV began transmitting a digital television signal on VHF channel 7 on November 1, 2002. The station discontinued regular programming on its analog signal, over VHF channel 5, on June 12, 2009, as part of the federally mandated transitioned from analog to digital television. The station's digital signal remained on its pre-transition VHF channel 7, using PSIP to display KOCO-TV's virtual channel as 5 (corresponding to its analog channel) on digital television receivers. After the switchover, the marginal reductions to the broadcast radius of KOCO's digital signal created some reception gaps in parts of southern and north-central Oklahoma that previously, at best, received Grade B coverage from its analog signal. In May 2010, the station installed a new digital transmitter antenna and dish on the Britton Road tower to help extend KOCO's signal reception to the affected areas.

As part of the SAFER Act, KOCO-TV kept its analog signal on the air until July 12 to inform viewers of the digital television transition through a loop of public service announcements from the National Association of Broadcasters.

ATSC 3.0 deployment
On October 8, 2020, KOCO commenced ATSC 3.0 digital transmissions over the signal of local NextGen TV host station KAUT-TV; KOCO was among five Oklahoma City-area stations owned by broadcasters associated with the Pearl NextGen TV consortium—accompanied by the respective duopolies of NBC affiliate KFOR-TV and independent station KAUT (owned by Nexstar Media Group), and Fox affiliate KOKH-TV and CW affiliate KOCB (owned by Sinclair Broadcast Group)—that deployed the fledgling ATSC 3.0 standard on that date. The station's 3.0 signal transmits over UHF digital channel 19.5005, using PSIP to display KOCO's virtual channel as 5.1 on digital television receivers.

Translators
To reach viewers throughout the 34 counties comprising the Oklahoma City market, KOCO-TV extends its over-the-air coverage area through a network of five low-power digital translator stations – all of which transmit using PSIP virtual channel 5 – encompassing much of Western Oklahoma that distribute its programming beyond the  range of its broadcast signal.

Notes

References

External links
 koco.com - KOCO-TV official website
  - KOCO-DT2 ("MeTV Oklahoma City") official website

OCO-TV
ABC network affiliates
MeTV affiliates
Story Television affiliates
TheGrio affiliates
GetTV affiliates
Television channels and stations established in 1954
Peabody Award winners
Hearst Television
1954 establishments in Oklahoma
Former Gannett subsidiaries